Mallobathra cana is a moth of the family Psychidae. This species is endemic to New Zealand.

Taxonomy 
This species was first described by Alfred Philpott in 1927 using two male specimens he collected at 3500 ft on the Dun Mountain in Nelson. The male holotype specimen is held at the New Zealand Arthropod Collection.

Description 
Philpott described this species as follows:

Distribution
This species is endemic to New Zealand.

References 

Moths described in 1927
Moths of New Zealand
Psychidae
Endemic fauna of New Zealand
Taxa named by Alfred Philpott
Endemic moths of New Zealand